Antonio Zeno (died 1530) was a Roman Catholic prelate who served as Bishop of Lipari (1515–1530).

Biography
On 26 January 1515, Antonio Zeno was appointed during the papacy of Pope Leo X as Bishop of Lipari.
He served as Bishop of Lipari until his death in 1530.

References

External links and additional sources
 (for Chronology of Bishops) 
 (for Chronology of Bishops) 

16th-century Italian Roman Catholic bishops
Bishops appointed by Pope Leo X
1530 deaths